The Masked Raider is an alias of several fictional characters appearing in American comic books published by Marvel Comics. The original character went by the name of Jim Gardley and appeared in comic books published during the 1930s and 1940s period known as the Golden Age of Comic Books, he was created by writer and artist Al Anders. Jim Gardley was a gunslinger and former rancher active during the American frontier.   He was one of the few individuals that held the Eternity Mask for a short period. In Marvel Comics #1000, it was revealed how the Golden Age Masked Raider died and a new character, yet unidentified, had taken up the name. He was in the possession of the Eternity Mask.

Publication history
Created by writer-artist Al Anders, Jim Gardley first appeared in the Timely Comics' anthology series Marvel Comics #1 (Oct. 1939), and ran through issue #12 (Oct. 1940) of the by-then retitled Marvel Mystery Comics.

The first Western character published by Timely, the predecessor of Marvel Comics, the Masked Raider is Jim Gardley, who with his horse Lightning dedicates his life to fighting the lawless and bringing justice to the oppressed.

He is unrelated to the Charlton Comics series Billy the Kid, which for its first eight issues was titled Masked Raider.

In the milestone issue Marvel Comics #1000, the comic aimed to celebrate the long history of Marvel Comics, in which it was shown that the long-forgotten original character had died and a new legacy character had taken up the Masked Raider mantle and was in the possession of Eternity Mask, a powerful mask that various characters over the course of history have worn (Jim Gardley wearing the Eternity Mask instead of a normal mask was a retcon in Marvel Comics #1000, to tie various disparate parts of Marvel continuity together). The yet-unnamed superhero reappeared in the Incoming! one-shot. Marvel Comics announced in 2019 that a new Masked Raider series would be published in 2020 with the new hero.

Fictional character biography

Jim Gardley
Jim Gardley was a cattle rancher in Arizona who in 1849 was falsely accused of cattle rustling, forcing him to go on the run. He took up the mantle of the Masked Raider to clear his name. Under undisclosed circumstances, Gardley found the Eternity Mask, a fragment of the cosmic entity Eternity which grants those who wear it powers equal to whoever they face. In 1880, Gardley is attacked and mortally wounded by unknown assailants. He is found by Dr. Matt Masters, once the masked outlaw known as the Cactus Kid, and dies in front of the man. Masters takes the Eternity Mask and becomes the Black Rider.

Second Masked Raider
In the modern day, an unidentified individual finds the Eternity Mask. Operating anonymously, they approach and interact with several superheroes, while investigating the activities of the mysterious Enclave, such as their efforts to revive Korvac.

In their investigation, the Masked Raider finds a mysterious murder case, but determining it to not be the Enclave's work they instead draw New York's superheroes attention to it.

Reception
In American Comic Book Chronicles, Kurt Mitchell and Roy Thomas write that the Masked Raider is "a lifeless Lone Ranger imitation."

References

External links
Masked Raider at Don Markstein's Toonopedia. Archived from the original on February 15, 2016.
Grand Comics Database
Comicbookresources.com: Marvel Comics #1

Comics characters introduced in 1939
Golden Age superheroes
Marvel Comics Western (genre) characters
Timely Comics characters
Vigilante characters in comics
Western (genre) gunfighters